Abel Hermant (3 February 1862 – 29 September 1950) was a French novelist, playwright, essayist and writer, and member of the Académie française.

Life and career
Hermant was born in Paris, the son of an architect. He received a degree from the École Normale Supérieure in 1880, and published his first volume of verse in 1883, The Contempt. After several youthful novels, he moved to ironic analysis of the popular mores of the Belle Époque and achieved popular success. His first semi-autobiographical novel, Monsieur Rabosson of 1884, established his reputation as a satirical social observer. Its follow-up Le Cavalier Miserey of 1887, dealt with the issue of homosexuals in the military.

Between 1901 and 1937 Hermant embarked on a series of 20 linked novels with the general title Memoirs to Serve for a History of Society, but his contributions to literature included many popular plays, drama criticism for Le Figaro and Gil Blas, and a series of grammarian articles for Le Temps under the name "Lancelot" defending the purity of the French language.

By 1899 Hermant was well-connected in society; for instance he was the guest of Anna de Noailles at Évian-les-Bains, where he became friends with Marcel Proust. After a number of tries Hermant was elected to the Académie française on 30 June 1927.

During World War II Hermant's contributions to Jean Luchaire's pro-Nazi evening daily newspaper Les Nouveaux Temps, beginning in 1940, his open support of the Vichy regime, and his criticisms of the French Army, marked him as a collaborator. At over 80 years of age, he was sentenced to life in prison on 15 December 1945. Hermant achieved the negative distinction of being one of the four "immortals" removed from the Académie française after World War II for collaboration with Germany. Hermant and Abel Bonnard were expelled outright, in disgrace; Charles Maurras of Action Française and Marshal Philippe Pétain had their seats declared vacant and were not replaced until their deaths.

Pardoned and released in 1948, Abel Hermant tried to justify his conduct during the Occupation in his Thirteenth Notebook. He died shortly thereafter.

Works

 Ermeline—1796 (1882–1890)
 Les Mépris (1883)
 M. Rabosson (l'éducation universitaire) (1884)
 La Mission de Cruchod (Jean-Baptiste) (1885)
 Le Cavalier Miserey (1887)
 Nathalie Madoré (1888)
 Amour de tête (1890)
 Cœurs à part (1890)
 Les Confidences d'une aïeule (1893)
 Le Disciple aimé (1895)
 Le Frisson de Paris (1895)
 La Meute (1896)
 Les Transatlantiques (1897)
 Le Faubourg (1899)
 Sylvie ou la Curieuse d'amour (1890)
 Confession d'un homme d'aujourd'hui (1901–1929)
 L'Archiduc Paul (1902)
 L'Esbroufe (1904)
 La Belle Madame Héber (1905)
 Chaîne anglaise (1906)
 Monsieur de Courpière (1907)
 Les Affranchis (1908)
 Mémoires pour servir à l'histoire de la société. Chronique du cadet de Coutras (1909)
 Le Premier Pas (1910)
 La fameuse comédienne (1913)
 Madame (1914)
 Histoire amoureuse de Fanfan (1917)
 Le crépuscule tragique (1921)
 Le Cycle de Lord Chelsea (1923)
 Xavier ou Les entretiens sur la grammaire française (1923)
 Les Fortunes de Ludmilla (1924)
 Les Confidences d'une biche (1924)
 Les noces vénitiennes (1924)
 Camille aux cheveux courts (1927)
 Le Nouvel Anacharsis. Promenade au jardin des lettres grecques (1928)
 Affaires de cœur (1934)
 Poppée, l'Amante de l'Antéchrist (1935)
 Une vie, trois guerres—Témoignages et souvenirs (1943)
 Le Treizième Cahier: rêveries et souvenirs d'un philosophe proscrit (1949)

References
 Columbia Dictionary of Modern European Literature, by Jean Albert Bédé, William Benbow
 Marcel Proust, by William C. Carter, p. 269

External links

 
 Association des amis d'Abel Hermant

1861 births
1950 deaths
Writers from Paris
Expelled members of the Académie Française
French collaborators with Nazi Germany
French theatre critics
Grammarians from France
19th-century French novelists
20th-century French novelists
19th-century French dramatists and playwrights
French male novelists
20th-century French dramatists and playwrights
19th-century French male writers
20th-century French male writers
French male non-fiction writers
Le Figaro people